Bonisław refers to the following places in Poland:

 Bonisław, Mława County
 Bonisław, Sierpc County